
Year 163 BC was a year of the pre-Julian Roman calendar. At the time it was known as the Year of the Consulship of Gracchus and Thalna (or, less frequently, year 591 Ab urbe condita) and the First Year of Houyuan (後元). The denomination 163 BC for this year has been used since the early medieval period, when the Anno Domini calendar era became the prevalent method in Europe for naming years.

Events 
 By place 

 Egypt 
 The Ptolemaic king Ptolemy VI Philometor is restored to his throne through the intervention of the citizens of Alexandria. However, the Romans intervene and partition the kingdom, giving Ptolemy VIII Euergetes Cyrenaica and Ptolemy VI Cyprus and Egypt. The two brothers accept the Roman partition.

 Seleucid Empire 
 In the turmoil following the death of Antiochus IV, the governor of Media, Timarchus becomes the independent ruler of Media, opposing Lysias who is acting as regent for young king Antiochus V Eupator.
 Maccabean Revolt: 
 Regent Lysias tries to make peace with the Jews in Judea. He offers them full religious freedom if they will lay down their arms.  Moderates including the Hasideans consent, but Judas Maccabeus argues for full political as well as religious freedom.
 Maccabee campaigns of 163 BC: The Maccabees attack nearby regions to Judea, fighting in a civil conflict between Gentiles and Jews.

 Roman Republic 
 The Roman playwright Terence's play Heauton Timorumenos ("The Self-Tormentor") is first performed.

Births 
 Marcus Aemilius Scaurus, Roman politician and ambassador (d. 89 BC)
 Tiberius Sempronius Gracchus, Roman politician, who, as a plebeian tribune, will cause political turmoil in the Republic through his attempts to legislate agrarian reforms; his political ideals will eventually lead to his death at the hands of supporters of the conservative faction (Optimates) of the Roman Senate (d. 132 BC)

Deaths 
 Xin Zhui, Chinese noblewoman
 Zhang Yan, known formally as Empress Xiaohui, empress of the Chinese Han Dynasty (b. 202 BC)

References